To Kill with Intrigue is a 1977 historical action-drama film directed by Lo Wei. A joint Hong Kong and South Korean co-production with martial arts, revenge and romance film elements, the film stars Hong Kong action movie star Jackie Chan with Taiwanese actress Hsu Feng and South Korean actress Jeong Hee. The movie was filmed in South Korea.

Plot
Ding Can-ren (Hsu Feng) leads a gang known as the Killer Bees on a revenge mission to kill Lei Shao-feng (Jackie Chan) and his family. However, she kills everyone but Lei Shao-feng and falls in love with him.

Cast
Jackie Chan - as Lei Shao-feng
Hsu Feng - as Ding Can-ren
Jeong Hee (credited as Yu Ling Lung) - as Qian-qian (also known as Chin Chin)
Shin Il-Ryong - as Jin-chuan
George Wang - as Dragon Escort Master
Chan Wai Lau - as assassin's chief
Chan San Yat - as assassin 
To Wai Wo - as assassin 
Yuen Biao - as assassin 
Chin Yuet Sang - as castle guard

Production
Jackie mentions, in his book I Am Jackie Chan, how much of the plot is confusing, and he was sure that even the director, Lo Wei, didn't even know what was going on. He has also gone on to express that tensions between himself and the director along with the generally cold weather at the time of filming made for a frustrating experience.

Box office
In Hong Kong, the film grossed 292,664.90.

Trivia
For the Japanese release of this film, the name of Chu Feng's character, Chin Chin, had to be changed because Chin Chin is the slang for penis in Japan.

See also
 Jackie Chan filmography
 List of Hong Kong films
 List of martial arts films
 Rurouni Kenshin: Trust & Betrayal (1999), an original video animation series involving similar plot elements

References

External links

1977 films
1977 martial arts films
1970s action films
1970s action drama films
1970s historical drama films
1970s martial arts films
1970s Cantonese-language films
Films based on works by Gu Long
Films shot in South Korea
Historical action films
Hong Kong films about revenge
Hong Kong action films
Hong Kong historical films
Hong Kong martial arts films
Hong Kong multilingual films
Hong Kong romantic drama films
1970s Korean-language films
South Korean films about revenge
South Korean action drama films
South Korean historical drama films
South Korean martial arts films
South Korean multilingual films
South Korean romantic drama films
1970s Hong Kong films